Woodmoor is a neighborhood in the northern section of Silver Spring, Maryland in southeastern Montgomery County, in the U.S. state of Maryland. Its borders extend from U.S. 29 to the west, Northwest Branch Park to the north, the Capital Beltway (I-95) to the east, and University Boulevard to the south. It lies on one of the "Four Corners" at the northeastern corner of the intersection of Colesville Road (U.S. 29), and University Boulevard (Maryland 193).

Commerce 
At that corner of the Four Corners intersection, is an outdoor shopping center, known as Woodmoor Shopping Plaza. Some of the occupants include the following: the Silver Spring Stage, a well-regarded regional theater, a Starbucks Coffee, a Chipotle restaurant, Santucci's Deli (run by the Santucci family, local to the neighborhood), The Watch Pocket (a clock and watch repair shop and vendor, and one of two jewelry stores), a family-run independent grocery, beer and wine store, a barber shop, a UPS Shipping outlet, a Sprint Mobile (non-corporate) franchise, Woodmoor Pastries, a Subway sandwich restaurant, Woodmoor Cleaners, a CVS Pharmacy, and a branch of Bank of America.

In the 1950s, a kosher deli/restaurant and bakery opened in Four Corners called "Sid Mandell's Restaurant & Deli", owned by Sidney "Sid" Mandell, the son of Jewish immigrants from Austria and Russia. The deli was a popular cultural icon and was open seven days a week. After Jewish residents began leaving Four Corners, the owner retired and the deli was closed in 1980. The building where the deli used to be is now occupied by Righttime Medical Care, an urgent care center.

Until the passage of the Fair Housing Act of 1968, racially restrictive covenants were used in Woodmoor to prevent African-Americans and other people of color from living in Woodmoor. In 2020, residents of Woodmoor and activists were working to remove racist language from property records "deed by deed".

Culture 

Highlights of the year are the community Christmas tree lighting as well as a menorah, a local Oktoberfest, and  Bloody Mary cocktail making competition, which coincides annually with the Wimbledon tennis tournament's gentleman's final each July.

History 
The first houses in the neighborhood were built in the late 1930s.

Transportation 
Washington Metro service is available on the Red Line at the nearby Wheaton and Silver Spring stations. Woodmoor is served by Metrobus numbers Z6, Z8, C2, and C4, as well as Ride On number 9. The Piney Branch Road station of the Purple Line will be built in nearby Long Branch at the intersection of University Boulevard and Piney Branch Road and is expected to be open to the public by 2022.

The neighborhood also has the dubious distinction of being serviced by the "Sorriest Bus Stop in America", according to a survey performed by Streetsblog. The bus stop is located at the intersection of Route 29 and Crestmoor Drive.

References 

Historic Jewish communities in the United States
Four Corners, Maryland
Jews and Judaism in Silver Spring, Maryland
Neighborhoods in Maryland
Outer Silver Spring, Maryland